Forced Vengeance is a 1982 American action film, starring Chuck Norris, Mary Louise Weller and Camila Griggs. The film was directed by James Fargo, written by Franklin Thompson and James Fargo and filmed in the Crown Colony of Hong Kong and Portuguese Macau.

Plot
When the owner and proprietor of the Lucky Dragon casino in Hong Kong refuses to let mobsters take over his business he and his family are hit. Dragon's chief of security, Josh Randall (Chuck Norris) goes looking for the head of the syndicate to exact revenge for the murder of his employer, friend and mentor.

Cast

Production
The film was originally known as The Jade Jungle. It had Norris' biggest budget yet, costing $5 million, and was from a major studio, MGM. The title was changed during production to Forced Vengeance.

Reception

Critical response
Variety wrote, "In the unlikely event that a film historian stumbles across 'Forced Vengeance' 20 years from now, he would probably guess that it was made somewhere around 1974—75. In setting, plotting, themes and action motifs, latest Chuck Norris pic is incredibly reminiscent of those unlamented Yank-vs.-Hong Kong syndicate martial arties of that era. For Norris, who has given signs of trying to graduate from the genre, this is a step backwards, or at least is treading water." Kevin Thomas of the Los Angeles Times wrote that by the middle of the film, "bone-crunching, flesh-ripping violence so dominates the screen that the film simply starts drowning in a sea of blood. By the end, it's hard to care, let alone differentiate, between the good guys and the bad. Such wretched excess is especially lamentable because 'Forced Vengeance' starts off with a lot going for it: a serviceable, if familiar story (by Franklin Thompson), some likable people to root for, unfailingly photogenic and atmospheric Hong Kong locales (well photographed by Rexford Metz) and crisp direction by James Fargo, a Clint Eastwood alumnus." Richard Harrington of The Washington Post called the film "one of Norris' less sterling efforts, a scratchy mono to the stereo of such earlier efforts as 'Return of the Dragon' and 'Force of One.' Part of the problem is a script that seems better suited to '60s television ... Another part of the problem is Norris' monotonous acting." Jimmy Summers of BoxOffice wrote, "Maybe pairing Chuck Norris with MGM was just more than the karate star could handle. Instead of being one of his classiest movies, 'Forced Vengeance' is one of his worst ... The presence of MGM veterans Tom and Jerry is the sole indication that this is an MGM movie. Otherwise it has the out-of-focused, grainy look of a chop-socky epic from China."

See also
 List of American films of 1982
 Chuck Norris filmography

References

External links

 
 

1982 films
1982 action films
American action films
American films about revenge
American martial arts films
Metro-Goldwyn-Mayer films
1982 martial arts films
Films directed by James Fargo
Films set in Hong Kong
Films shot in Hong Kong
Films shot in Macau
1980s American films